Alberico Di Cecco (born 19 April 1974) is an Italian long-distance runner who specializes in the marathon race.

Biography
He was banned from the sport for two years by the Italian National Olympic Committee (CONI) after testing positive for EPO at the Italian Championship on October 12, 2008.

Achievements
All results regarding marathon, unless stated otherwise

Personal bests
5000 metres - 14:06
10000 metres - 28:48.51 min (2000)
Half marathon - 1:01:55 hrs (2002)
Marathon - 2:08:02 hrs (2005)

See also
 Italian all-time top lists - Marathon

References

External links
 

1974 births
Living people
Italian male long-distance runners
Italian male marathon runners
Italian sportspeople in doping cases
Athletes (track and field) at the 2004 Summer Olympics
Olympic athletes of Italy
Doping cases in athletics
World Athletics Championships athletes for Italy
Italian ultramarathon runners
Athletics competitors of Centro Sportivo Carabinieri